Clendenin Historic District is a national historic district in Clendenin, Kanawha County, West Virginia.   The district includes 38 contributing structures constructed between about 1890 and 1940.  Many of the major downtown buildings are of brick and feature heavy cornices, brick corbelling, and vernacular
builders facades.

It was listed on the National Register of Historic Places in 1996.

References

Neoclassical architecture in West Virginia
Colonial Revival architecture in West Virginia
Gothic Revival architecture in West Virginia
Historic districts in Kanawha County, West Virginia
National Register of Historic Places in Kanawha County, West Virginia
Historic districts on the National Register of Historic Places in West Virginia